Minoo Watchtower is a 1996 film by the Iranian director Ebrahim Hatamikia. Hatamikia also wrote the script for the film, which was lensed by Aziz Sa'ati. Niki Karimi, Ali Mosaffa and Mohamad Reza Sharifinia starred in the principal roles.

Cast

References

1996 films
Iranian war drama films
1990s Persian-language films
Films directed by Ebrahim Hatamikia